
Gmina Czermin is a rural gmina (administrative district) in Mielec County, Subcarpathian Voivodeship, in south-eastern Poland.

Villages
Gmina Czermin contains the villages and settlements of Breń Osuchowski, Czermin, Dąbrówka Osuchowska, Łysaków, Otałęż, Szafranów, Trzciana, Wola Otałęska and Ziempniów.

Neighbouring gminas
Gmina Czermin is bordered by the gminas of Borowa, Łubnice, Mielec, Szczucin and Wadowice Górne.

References
Polish official population figures 2006

Czermin
Gmina Czermin